Gerard Vaughan may refer to:

Sir Gerard Vaughan (British politician) (1923–2003), British Conservative minister
Gerard Vaughan (Australian politician) (born 1946), former member of the Victorian Legislative Assembly
Gerard Vaughan (art historian) (born 1953), Australian art historian and curator
Gerard Vaughan, CEO of the Alcohol Advisory Council of New Zealand